Sleights is a railway station on the Esk Valley Line, which runs between Middlesbrough and Whitby via Nunthorpe. It is owned by Network Rail and managed by Northern Trains.

History

Originally just a simple halt, it opened to horse-drawn traffic on 15 May 1835, with a full public service operating from June 1835. The station platforms and the main building, a mock-Tudor design by George Townsend Andrews, were constructed eleven years later and opened in 1846.

The station used to have two platforms for up and down line working, but in common with the other stations between Grosmont and Whitby, this was reduced to single track working in 1984 when the second track was lifted and Sleights signal box closed. Trains now stop at the former Up line platform, where the main station buildings, including the station master's house, are now a Grade II-listed private residence. The former down platform used to have a wooden waiting shed and store; this building was recovered by the North Yorkshire Moors Railway and re-erected on the extended down platform at Grosmont.

Behind the down platform was a small goods yard with a single siding. The Up line platform is currently managed and maintained by Northern Trains and Esk Valley Railway, whilst the down platform and derelict signal box are the responsibility of Network Rail.

At one end of the platform, a footpath carries passengers over the River Esk to Briggswath on a small box girder bridge, while at the other the A169 towers over the railway and river on a bridge opened on 26 January 1937. The site of the modern day footpath used to be a level crossing carrying the main Whitby-Pickering road to a stone bridge over the Esk, before this was washed away during floods in 1930. Next to the crossing a 19th-century brick built signal box remains, now unused and boarded up.

Services

As of July 2022, the station is served by five trains per day towards Whitby. Heading towards Middlesbrough via Nunthorpe, there are four trains per day. All services are operated by Northern Trains.

Rolling stock used: Class 156 Super Sprinter and Class 158 Express Sprinter

Heritage trains from the North Yorkshire Moors Railway can be seen passing through Sleights Station, however they do not stop.

References

Sources

External links
 
 

Railway stations in the Borough of Scarborough
DfT Category F2 stations
Railway stations in Great Britain opened in 1846
Northern franchise railway stations
Former York and North Midland Railway stations
George Townsend Andrews railway stations